Adrian Blake (born 15 July 2005) is an English professional footballer who plays as a forward for Watford.

Career
Born in Islington, Blake joined Watford in 2013.

Blake made his senior Watford debut on 23 August 2022 when coming on as a second half substitute in a 2–0 home defeat to MK Dons in the second round of the EFL Cup.

Personal life
Born in England, Blake is of Jamaican descent.

Career statistics

Club
.

References

2005 births
Living people
Footballers from Islington (district)
Footballers from Greater London
English footballers
English sportspeople of Jamaican descent
Association football forwards
Watford F.C. players